South Kerala Diocese is a diocese of the Church of South India which consists of CSI churches in Trivandrum and Kollam districts of Kerala. It is one of the biggest dioceses in the Church of South India. In April 2015, a part of the diocese was removed to form a new diocese, the Kollam-Kottarakkara Diocese. In Kerala, there were, until April 2015, three other CSI Dioceses viz: North Kerala Diocese, Madhya Kerala Diocese, East Kerala Diocese. In 2010, the diocese had 352 ordained pastors, 49 retired pastors and more than 200 church workers. There are 70 districts and 623 churches in this diocese.

History
The history of the Protestant Missions in South Kerala begins with the arrival of William Tobias Ringeltaube on 25 April 1806 at Mylaudy near Cape Comorin. As missionary work was already started in Tranquebar, a Danish colony, Ringeltaube travelling in a Danish ship arrived at Tranquebadi, invited by Vedamanikan Maharasan the first convert from this region. Travancore was then a native state under British protection ruled by its Maharaja. It was with great difficulty and largely through the intervention of the British Resident in Travancore, Colin Macaulay, that Ringeltaube obtained permission to construct a Church at Mylaudy. In May 1809 the foundation stone was laid for the Church. The construction of a modest structure was dedicated in September that year. The Mylaudy Church was the first Protestant church built in the erstwhile princely state of Travancore, and it formed the nucleus of the present South Kerala Dioceses of Kanayakumari and South Kerala.

Bishops of the South Kerala Diocese 
 Arnold Legg (1947-1965)
 William Paul Vachalan (1967 -1972)
 Isaiah Jesudason (1973-1990)
 Samuel Amirtham (1990-1997)
 J. W. Gladstone (1997-2011)
 Dharmaraj Rasalam (2011 -till date)

Notable Churches under South Kerala Diocese 
Mateer Memorial Church, LMS,Trivandrum 

The Mateer Memorial Church, situated in the heart of the city of Trivandrum, is one of the oldest of its kind in South India. The origin of the Trivandrum Church dates back to the arrival of the Rev. John Cox, the first LMS missionary in Trivandrum, in 1838 . The new church building for the church was dedicated on the first day of December 1906. The church was dedicated by Rev. R. W. Thompson, the Foreign Secretary of the LMS who was heading a deputation as part of the centenary of the Travancore Mission. The new church building was named Mateer Memorial Church in honour of the second missionary Rev. Samuel Mateer.

Missionaries 
William Tobias Ringeltaube

Charles Mead

Dr Theodore Howard Somervel

Rev John Abbs

Rev Samuel Mateer

London Mission Society 

The origin of London Missionary Society was associated with the evangelical revival in England in the last quarter of the eighteenth century. Every Christian in England considered it his duty to strive hard for the spreading of the gospel both at home and abroad. The enlightened Christians in England also advocated strongly in favour of allowing missionaries to spread the gospel in India. This dream became a reality with the founding of missionary societies. Among these, the London Missionary Society stood in the vanguard; it came into being in 1795 on a nondenominational basis. Its motto was Isaiah 52:7 "How beautiful upon the mountains are the feet of him that bringeth good tidings that publisheth peace; that bringeth good tidings of good; that publisheth salvation; that saith unto Zion, Thy God reigneth!" The fundamental principle of the society was "not to send Presbyterianism, Independency, Episcopacy or any other form of church order and Government; but the Glorious Gospel of the blessed God". The history of the missionary activities of the Protestant church in Travancore commenced with the arrival of William Tobias Ringeltaube, a missionary of the LMS in CE 1806.  The LMS started its work first among the Parayas and it soon spread among the Nadars. Once the Nadars were considered an oppressed class in Travancore, who were not satisfied with their position. The attention of the missionaries of the LMS was also turned to the lower sections of the society like Parayas, Pulaya, Ezhavas etc., who suffered from caste tyranny and oppression. They were considered as the "lower orders." The LMS missionaries took a strong stand against caste distinctions within the churches through education. Their aim was to create "an independent, selfsupporting, self-governing and self-propagating native church. The result was the formation of the South India United Church (S.I.U.C) in 1908. When SIUC was formed in South India, Travancore Mission of the LMS was the most successful among the missions in the whole of India.   

After the Indian Independence, On 27 September 1947 the General Assembly of South India United Church, the General council of Church of India, Pakistan, Burma and Ceylon, and South India Provincial Synod of Methodist Church joined together to from the CHURCH OF SOUTH INDIA as the largest united national church in India. The continued growth has been further enriched with the joining of the churches of Basel Mission and the Anglican Diocese of Nandyal. A unique church was born out of the blending of the Episcopal and non - Episcopal traditions as a gift of God to the people of India and as a visible sign of the ecclesiastical unity for the universal church. 

The Rt.Rev.A.H.Legg was consecrated on 27-09-1947 and installed as the first Bishop of the South Travancore Diocese on 13-10-1947. The South Travancore Diocese was bifurcated into the Kanyakumari Diocese and the South Kerala Diocese in 1959 and the Rt.Rev.A.H.Legg continued to be the first Bishop of the South Kerala Diocese till be returned to England in 1965.

The Rt. Rev. William PaulVachalan was consecrated and installed in the South Kerala Diocese on 2-7-1967. He died on 5-11-1972 while in service. The Rt.Rev.Isaiah Jesudason,  was consecrated and installed in the South Kerala Diocese on 5 August 1973. He was Deputy Moderator of the Church of South India from 1980–81 and Moderator from 1982–1987. He retired from active service on 14 February 1990 on completion of 65 years of age.

The Rt.Rev.Dr.Samuel Amirtham was consecrated and installed as Bishop of the Diocese on 20-05-1990. He was director of the Programme on Theological Education and Director of the Ecumenical Institute, Bossey of the WCC 1980–1990. He retired from active service on 19the August 1997.

Most.Rev.Dr.J.W.Gladstone, was consecrated and installed as Bishop on 16-9-1997. He was the principal of KUT seminary, Trivandrum and the president of the Senate of Serapore, Culcutta. He is selected as the Moderator of the C.S.I. Synod in 2008. He retired from active service on 25 December 2010 on completion of 65 years of age.

The Rt.Rev. A.Dharmaraj Rasalam was consecrated  and installed as Bishop on 23.7.2011.

List of churches
Church of South India / South Kerala Diocese ( CSI / SKD ) List of Churches

There 623 churches in CSI / SKD, Thiruvananthapuram. As a whole the churches are divided in AREA and DISTRICT.

They are as given below.

AREA List

List of AREA is give below

AREA List along with DISTRICT

AREA List with DISTRICT and churches

Institutions under South Kerala Diocese
Medical College
 Dr. Somervell Memorial CSI Medical College, Karakonam
Nursing College 
 CSI College of Nursing, Karakonam
Engineering College
 John Cox Memorial CSI Institute of Technology, Kannammola
Arts & Science College 
 Christian College, Kattakada
Hostels
 LMS Wills Hostel for Men 
 LMS Women's Hostel

Administration
Vice Chairman - 
Secretary - Dr. Praveen TT 
Treasurer -

Board For Youth Work
Rev. Ajin Kamal (Co ordinator)
Sujith Kumar S T (Secretary)
Board For Young Family Fellowship
Rt.Rev.A.Dharmaraj Rasalam (Chairman)
Mr.Suresh Devarajan (Secretary)
Rev.Shabu Lawrence (Coordinator)
Rev. E.Sunin Spenzer (Area coordinator)
Mr. Jose Rajeevan (Area Convener)
Dr. Sindhuja Suresh (Area convener)

See also
Madhya Kerala Diocese
East Kerala Diocese
North Kerala Diocese
Church of South India
Christianity in Kerala

References

External links

CSI Pappanamkonam,Thiruvananthapuram
CSI Mateer Memorial Church ,Trivandrum
CSI Madhya Kerala Diocese
CSI Church Kattakada
CSI Church Uriyacode
CSI Church Peroorkada
CSI Church Dubai South Kerala Diocese
Christian College Kattakada
John Cox Memorial CSI Institute of Technology
Dr Somervell Memorial Medical College
CSI Amaravila

 
South Kerala
Dioceses in Kerala